In enzymology, a protein-glutamine glutaminase is an enzyme that catalyzes the chemical reaction

protein L-glutamine + H2O  protein L-glutamate + NH3

Thus, the two substrates of this enzyme are protein L-glutamine and H2O, whereas its two products are protein L-glutamate and NH3.

This enzyme belongs to the family of hydrolases, those acting on carbon-nitrogen bonds other than peptide bonds, specifically in linear amides.  The systematic name of this enzyme class is protein-L-glutamine amidohydrolase. Other names in common use include peptidoglutaminase II, glutaminyl-peptide glutaminase, destabilase, and peptidylglutaminase II.

References

 

EC 3.5.1
Enzymes of unknown structure